Christine Lee Silawan, a 16-year-old high school student and church collector, was found dead in a vacant lot in Lapu-Lapu City, Cebu. Her body was discovered with multiple stab wounds and her face skinned beyond recognition. She was also naked from the waist down and possibly raped.

Murder 
Before her murder, it was reported that 16-year-old student Christine Lee Silawan's unidentified boyfriend supposedly used a fake Facebook account to lure her into meeting him. Investigators discovered that the suspect had posed as another man on Facebook, trying to "court" her. On March 11, 2019, Silawan was found dead in a vacant lot in Lapu-Lapu City with multiple stab wounds and her face mutilated.

An autopsy also revealed that her tongue, trachea, esophagus, parts of her neck, and her right ear were missing.

Investigation and aftermath 
Jonas Martel Bueno, who was arrested for the murder of a 62-year-old farmer in Danao City, Cebu, denied involvement in Silawan's murder. Police said that the style of the killings in Danao City were "strikingly similar" to that of Silawan's.

The murder suspect, identified as 'John', was arrested at his home in Barangay Maribago, Lapu-Lapu City on March 16, 2019, based on conversation exchanged on Facebook Messenger. According to the Department of Social Welfare and Development (DSWD), if Silawan's ex-boyfriend known only as John killed her, he could be charged in court. John passed the discernment procedure conducted on him.

Forensic investigation stated that Silawan was murdered sometime between 6:00 pm and 7:00 pm on March 10, 2019. March 10 CCTV footage shows Silawan walking with a man in the early evening; this was the last known footage of her. The authorities said that Silawan broke up with John a few days before her murder, adding that they are looking at jealousy as the possible motive. The Philippine National Police (PNP) earlier said that at least three persons could have committed the murder. However, the allegations against the suspect were baseless according to the suspect's relative, who claimed that he was playing basketball with his friends and doing household chores on the day of her murder. The suspect's mother believed that her son was innocent and instead called for the real perpetrator. The suspect's mother added that her son would have been on the run if he had committed the murder. The suspect himself opened the door for the NBI, who filed the search warrant on him. According to the NBI, they based their suspicions on eyewitness testimony. CCTV footage showed the victim walking hurriedly away from the church being followed by the man at 6:12 pm — contrary to the mother's claim that he was playing basketball. According to the teenager's friend, who was selling food near the basketball court, he bought a balut around 7:00 pm or 8:00 pm and then went home.

The NBI reviewed Facebook Messenger exchanges between the suspect and Silawan where they found some deleted messages. They were also looking for evidence of the suspect's usage of a fake account to lure the victim into meeting her on March 10. The suspect underwent a drug test, which was negative. According to the NBI, the suspect is a former lover of Silawan and he was charged with murder; however the suspect did not admit to the crime. Silawan's mother, Lourdes Silawan, is convinced that the suspect and other cohorts committed the crime. The PNP declared the case as "closed" on March 19, but the police will continue to search for two other suspects. The suspect is now in DSWD custody.

The killing has elicited controversy and political debate over the proposed reinstatement of the death penalty as a punishment for heinous crimes.

The Public Attorney's Office forensic team confirmed on April 2, 2019, that Silawan was raped. The team found bleeding in her genitals; they also discovered that acid was possibly poured onto Silawan's face before being peeled off. It was discovered that Silawan was strangled to death using a rope, and the forensic team suspected that at least three people may have been involved.

On April 9, alleged murder suspect Renato Llenes was arrested by the police where he made an "extra-judicial confession" for killing her but he entered "not guilty" plea for the murder charges. Llenes claimed that his crime was inspired by Momo Challenge–which was prevalent at the time. On May 24, 2020, it was reported that Llenes allegedly killed himself by hanging.

See also 
 Black Dahlia, whose body was found mutilated

References 

2019 murders in the Philippines
Deaths by person in the Philippines
History of Cebu